In some Gnostic writings, Sabaoth is one of the sons of Ialdabaoth. According to Hypostasis of the Archons and On the Origin of the World, Sabaoth dethrones his father Ialdabaoth. In both accounts, Sabaoth repents, when he hears the voice of Sophia, condemns his father and his mother (matter) and after that is enthroned by Sophia in the seventh heaven. Some Church Fathers report on the other hand, that Gnostics identified Sabaoth with Ialdaboath himself.

Name 
The name Sabaoth appears in the Old Testament in reference to an army. In the First Book of Samuel, the name is used as a name of God. In Gnostic texts, the name should evidently rendered as "over all the forces (of chaos)".

In Gnostic sources 
Jan Zandee interprets Sabaoth's role as the opposite of Ialdabaoth. The psychics can choose between both; Ialdabaoth representing evil and Sabaoth representing good. Sabaoth becomes the current ruler of the world and thus fulfills the role of the God of Israel.

Thrown into Tartarus, Ialdabaoth envies his son, whereupon his envy takes on shape and becomes death. From death, envy, wrath, weeping, roar, loud shouting, sobber and grief emerge. Many of these emotions seem to be related to lament during funerals. As mourning was controversial among early Christians, associated with Satan, they might intentionally display disapproval about lamenting the dead and advocated control of emotions. However, this is not explicitly spelled out and some emotions, such as anger for the rulers of darkness, are approved, thus differing from Stoicism.

After Ialdabaoth brought death into the world, Sabaoth creates a host of cherubim, a notion also appearing in Jewish Merkabah mysticism.

Non-Gnostic sources 
Epiphanius of Salamis, the bishop of Salamis, Cyprus at the end of the 4th century, reports that Severian Encratites (also associated with Sethians) believed Sabaoth and Ialdabaoth to be one and the same, the God of law, and therefore evil. Celsus, a 2nd-century Greek philosopher, identified Ialdabaoth with Cronus and Sabaoth and Adonai with Zeus. Origen (c. 184 – c. 253) denies the equation. That such identifications appears within Gnostic documents themselves, has not been proven.

See also 
 Aeon (Gnosticism)
 Monad (Gnosticism)
 Archon (Gnosticism)

References

Sources 
 Roger A. Bullard "The Hypostasis of the Archons: The Coptic Text with Translation and Commentary" Walter de Gruyter 2012  pp. 110-112
 Francis T. Fallon "The Enthronement of Sabaoth" Brill Archive, 1978 pp. 80-83
 Ismo Dunderberg "Gnostic Morality Revisited" Mohr Siebeck 2015  pp. 35-37

Gnostic deities